Štětí is a town in Litoměřice District in the Ústí nad Labem Region of the Czech Republic. It has about 8,400 inhabitants.

Administrative parts
Villages of Brocno, Čakovice, Chcebuz, Hněvice, Počeplice, Radouň, Stračí, Újezd and Veselí are administrative parts of Štětí.

Etymology
The town's name is derived from the Old Czech word ščetie, which was a term for the poles driven into the swampy terrain as a basis for the upper construction.

Geography
It lies on the border of the Lower Eger Table and Ralsko Uplands. The town is situated on the right bank of the Elbe River.

History
The first written mention of Štětí is from 1312. In 1549, it was promoted to a town.

Demographics

Economy

Štětí is known as an industrial centre. In the town there is the largest paper mill in the Czech Republic. The paper mill is a part of the Mondi group.

Sights

The most significant building is the Church of Saints Simon and Jude. Originally it was built in the 14th century, but it was destroyed by a flood in 1784 and rebuilt in 1785.

Notable people
Franz Reichelt (1878–1912), Austrian tailor and inventor

References

External links

Cities and towns in the Czech Republic
Populated places in Litoměřice District
Populated riverside places in the Czech Republic
Populated places on the Elbe